is a Japanese footballer currently playing as a midfielder for Nagano Parceiro as a designated special player.

Career statistics

Club
.

Notes

References

1999 births
Living people
Association football people from Hokkaido
Sapporo University alumni
Japanese footballers
Association football midfielders
J3 League players
AC Nagano Parceiro players